TMSI may refer to:

 Temporary Mobile Subscriber Identity, data sent between a mobile phone and its network
 Trimethylsilyl iodide, a chemical compound

Temporary Mobile Subscriber Identities (TMSI) is allocated to mobile subscribers by VLRs, SGSNs, and MME in order to support the subscriber identity confidentiality. The VLR, SGSN, and MME must be capable of correlating an allocated TMSI with the IMSI of the MS to which it is allocated. An MS may be allocated three TMSIs; one for services provided through the MSC this is the TMSI, one for services provided through the SGSN; the packet-TMSI (P-TMSI), and one for the services provided the MME, i.e., the MME-TMSI or M-TMSI that is part of the GUTI.